George Smith RSA (1870-1934) was a Scottish artist specialising in landscapes and animals, with an emphasis on horses at work.

Life

He was born on 2 February 1870 in Mid Calder in West Lothian, just west of Edinburgh.
He was educated at George Watsons College then studied art at the Board of Manufacturers in Edinburgh and then in Antwerp under Verlat.

In the late 19th century he shared a studio with friend and fellow artist James Christie Prowett (1865-1946) at Beaton’s Mill in Bannockburn near Stirling. Prowett specialised in landscapes.
Smith exhibited at the Royal Academy in London and Royal Scottish Academy. In later life he lived at 47 Lauder Road in the Grange area of Edinburgh.

He died on 26 November 1934 and is buried with his sister in the Grange Cemetery in southern Edinburgh, close to his home. The grave lies against the south wall towards the south-east corner of the main cemetery.

Works
Horses at a Water Trough
Homeward Bound
Harvesting
Donkey Rides
Children on the Beach

Biography
Smith’s biography, The Life and Work of George Smith RSA (1870-1934) was written by Derek Ogsten in 1999.

References

1870 births
1934 deaths
Scottish artists
People from Midlothian